A kickoff is a method of starting a drive in gridiron football. Additionally, it may refer to a kickoff time, the scheduled time of the first  kickoff of a game. Typically, a kickoff consists of one team – the "kicking team" – kicking the ball to the opposing team – the "receiving team". The receiving team is then entitled to return the ball, i.e., attempt to advance it towards the kicking team's end zone, until the player with the ball is tackled by the kicking team, goes out of bounds, scores a touchdown, or the play is otherwise ruled dead. Kickoffs take place at the start of each half of play, the beginning of overtime in some overtime formats, and after scoring plays.

Common variants on the typical kickoff format include the onside kick, in which the kicking team attempts to regain possession of the ball; a touchback, which may occur if the ball is kicked into the receiving team's end zone; or a fair catch, in which a player on the receiving team asks to catch the ball without interference from the kicking team, waiving his entitlement to attempt a return rush. Additionally, penalties exist for various infractions such as a player violating his position restrictions prior to the kick (5-yard penalty), or if the ball goes out of bounds before touching a player (25 yards past the spot of the kick or placed at the spot the ball left the field of play, whichever is more advantageous to the receiving team).

Award 

A kickoff occurs at the start of each half and before the first overtime (in the National and Arena Football Leagues). It is also traditionally decided by a coin toss at the beginning of each game carried out by the referee. The visiting team captain calls either heads or tails. The winner of the coin toss elects whether to take first choice in the first half or the second half. The captain with first choice then picks either a team to kick off or an end of the field to defend. The other captain chooses the remaining option. At the beginning of the second half, the two captains choose in the reverse order. If an overtime is required, another coin toss takes place to decide who gets first possession during the overtime. After a touchdown the scoring team kicks the ball off to the opposing team. In American football a field goal also results in a kickoff by the scoring team, but in Canadian football the scored-against team has an option of scrimmaging from their 35-yard line or receiving a kickoff. An exception to the Canadian rule applies in U Sports competition; if a team scores a field goal on a play that began after the three-minute warning in the fourth quarter, a kickoff is mandatory, with the scoring team kicking off from the standard position of its own 45-yard line.

After a safety in Canadian football, the scored-against kicks off. In American football, a kickoff is an option, but most teams choose to punt the ball on the free kick; the National Football League, in contrast to most other leagues, prohibits the use of a kicking tee on a safety free kick.

Procedure 

The line where the ball is placed for kickoff varies among the rule books. It is placed on the kicking team's 30-yard line in six-man football, 35-yard line in college and professional outdoor football, 40-yard line in American high school football, 45-yard line in amateur Canadian football, and the goal line in indoor and arena football. For the 2016 season only, the Ivy League placed the ball on the 40-yard line in conference games. All players on the kicking team except the kicker (and, if used, a holder) must not cross the line at which the ball is placed until the ball is kicked. The receiving team must stay behind the line that is 10 yards from where the ball is placed. The ball can be fielded by the receiving team at any point after it has been kicked, or by the kicking team after it has traveled 10 yards or has been touched by a member of the receiving team. In American football (but not Canadian) touchback and fair catch rules apply to the kicked ball. If it is fielded by the kicking team, it is called an onside kick. A low, bouncing kick is called a squib kick. Although a squib kick typically gives the receiving team better field position than they would if a normal kick had been used, a squib kick is sometimes used to avoid giving up a long return, as well as use up a valuable amount of time on the clock, as it is impossible to fair catch such a kick. It is usually done when a team takes the lead in the final seconds, and is done to safely run out the remainder of the clock. Squib kicking with more than 20 seconds remaining has had unfortunate results (a line drive kick is more common when there are 20 to 50 seconds remaining; the typical hurry-up offense drive takes over a minute), but has been done by some teams.

Penalties 

If a receiving player crosses his restraining line before the kick, the ball is to be advanced 5 yards, then re-kicked. If a kicking team player crosses the line at which the ball is placed before it is kicked, the receiving team has the option either to have the kicking team re-kick from 5 yards farther back, or have 5 yards added on to the end of the return. In high school football, the receiving team only has the option to make the kicking team re-kick.

If the ball goes out of bounds without being touched by a player, the receiving team can choose either to have the ball moved back 5 yards and re-kicked, to take the ball 25 yards (30 yards under NCAA rules; 25 yards under National Federation high school rules) past the spot of the kick (usually at their own 35-yard line), or to take the ball where it went out of bounds. On an onside kick, if the ball does not travel ten yards before the kicking team recovers the ball, they will take a 5-yard penalty and have the chance to kick another onside kick. If the onside kick goes less than 10 yards again, the receiving team will receive the ball at the spot the kicking team recovered it. However, if the receiving team touches the ball before it goes 10 yards, either team can recover it unpenalized.

Kickoff into end zone 
Kickoffs entering the end zone are handled differently in American and Canadian rules. In the American college and professional game, if the ball goes out of bounds in the receiving team's end zone or is recovered and downed in the receiving team's end zone, the ball is placed at the receiving team's 25-yard line, and possession is given to the receiving team; these are known as touchbacks. High school football immediately rules the ball dead when the ball crosses the goal line; the ball cannot be returned from the end zone, nor can it be recovered there for a touchdown. NFL immediately rules the ball dead, when the ball touches the ground in the endzone, if not been touched by the receivers before. In the Canadian game if the ball goes into the end zone and then out of bounds without being touched, the receiving team scrimmages from the 25-yard line (no points are scored). If the receiving team gains possession of a kickoff in its own end zone and then fails to return it into the field of play, the kicking team scores one point, and the receiving team scrimmages from the 35-yard line. If the kicking team gains possession in the end zone, they score a touchdown. Various forms of indoor football also recognize the single, but the ball must not only cross the end zone, but pass through the uprights (as in a field goal) as well. If the kicking team recovers its own kickoff in the end zone in any version of the game (something that, as previously mentioned, is impossible in high school football), it scores a touchdown.

Kickoffs into the end zone resulting in touchbacks became much more common in the NFL in 2011 as a result of a rule change. Whereas the kicking team previously kicked the ball off from their 30-yard line, the NFL moved the spot of the kickoff up 5 yards before the 2011 season in an attempt to avoid injuries from high-speed collisions. Only 16 percent of kickoffs in the 2010 season were touchbacks, but that jumped to almost 44 percent after the rule change.

Return

To receive a kickoff and set up a kickoff return, the receiving team sets up their players starting from 10 yards back from the point the ball is kicked from. There are usually one or two players positioned deep (around the goal line) that will attempt to catch or pick up the ball after it is kicked off by the opposing team's kicker. They will then attempt to carry the ball as far as possible upfield, without being tackled or running out of bounds. The other players are to block the kickoff team from getting to their kickoff returner.

Alternatives
In certain leagues consisting of younger players, and in the short-lived professional Alliance of American Football, there are no kickoffs. Teams are automatically awarded the ball at a certain spot on the field. In the AAF, this spot was the 25-yard line of the team receiving possession.

See also 
Punt

External links 
 NFL rulebook online
 NFL Rules concerning Free Kicks (Kickoffs and Safety Kicks)
 CFL Rulebook

References 

American football plays
American football terminology
Canadian football terminology
Articles containing video clips